The following outline is provided as an overview and topical guide to green politics, a political ideology that aims for the creation of an ecologically sustainable society rooted in environmentalism, social liberalism, and grassroots democracy.  It began taking shape in the western world in the 1970s; since then Green parties have developed and established themselves in many countries across the globe, and have achieved some electoral success.

Nature of green politics 
Green politics can be described as:
 activism
 an ideology
 a political ideology
 a social movement
 a political movement
 part of the environmental movement

Essence of green politics 

 Green nationalism
 Green party

Contributing philosophies 
 Agrarianism
 Environmentalism
 Localism
 Social liberalism

Overlapping movements 
Green politics shares many ideas with the following movements:
 Animal rights movement
 Anti-globalization movement
 Alter-globalization movement
 Climate movement
 Conservation movement
 Environmental movement
 Feminist movement
 Local food movement
 Peace movement

Green schools of thought

Bright green environmentalism 

 Car-free movement
 Climate movement
 Conservation movement
 Eco-modernism
 Ecological modernization
 Prometheanism
 Technogaianism
 Positive environmentalism

Deep green environmentalism 

 Anti-consumerism
 Degrowth movement
 Anti-globalization movement
 Alter-globalization movement
 Global justice movement
 Anti-nuclear movement
 Bioregionalism
 Ecoauthoritarianism
 Ecocentrism
 Eco-fascism
 Green anarchism
 Anarcho-naturism
 Anarcho-primitivism
 Rewilding
 Communalism
 Eco-communalism
 Back-to-the-land movement
 Democratic confederalism
 Green municipalism
 Libertarian municipalism
 Social ecology
 Inclusive democracy
 Neo-Luddism
 Radical environmentalism
 Animal rights movement
 Deep Green Resistance
 Earth liberation movement

Light green environmentalism 

 Free-market environmentalism
 Eco-capitalism
 Sustainable capitalism
 Georgism
 Geolibertarianism
 Green libertarianism
 Green conservatism
 Fiscal environmentalism
 Green liberalism

Other 

 Eco-feminism
 Eco-nationalism
 Green Zionism
 Green left
 Eco-socialism
 Localism
 Queer ecology
 Green syndicalism

Opposition 
 Anti-environmentalism

Religious variants 

 Christian environmentalism
 Eco-theology
 Evangelical environmentalism
 Islamic environmentalism
 Jewish environmentalism
 Maori environmentalism
 Spiritual ecology

Values and principles 
 Four pillars of the Green Party
 Ecological wisdom
 Grassroots democracy
 Nonviolence
 Pacifism
 Peace movement
 Social justice
 Human rights
 Civil liberties
 Social equality
 Economic egalitarianism
 Equal opportunity
 Solidarity
 Global Greens Charter

Democracy 
 Consensus democracy
 Deliberative democracy
 Direct democracy
 Participatory democracy
 Grassroots democracy
 Bioregional democracy
 Inclusive Democracy

Environment 

 Ecotheology
 Environmentalism
 Green building
 Green technology
 Human ecology
 Political ecology
 Social ecology
 Sustainable development

Feminism 
 Ecofeminism
 Feminist economics

Green economics 

 Eco-capitalism
 Ecological economics
 Eco-socialism
 Ecotax
 Feminist economics
 Free-market environmentalism
 Georgism
 Geolibertarianism

Policy issues 
A few issues affect most of the green parties around the world, and can often inhibit global cooperation. Some affect structure, and others affect policy:
 Anti-nuclear
 Bioregionalism
 Biosafety
 Biosecurity
 Electoral reform
 Fundamentalism vs. Realism
 Green transport hierarchy
 Greenwashing
 Indigenous peoples
 Land reform
 Natural capitalism
 Primate extinction
 Prometheanism
 Rainforest destruction
 Safe trade
Sustainable transport
On matters of ecology, extinction, biosafety, biosecurity, safe trade and health security, "Greens" generally agree.  There are very substantial policy differences between and among Green Parties in various countries and cultures, and a continuing debate about the degree to which natural ecology and human needs align.  Agreement on particular issues is often reached using a consensus decision making process.

Organizations

Worldwide 
 Friends of the Earth (environmentalism)
 Greenpeacean environmentalist non-governmental organization
 Global Greens (green politics)
 World Ecological Parties (bright green environmentalism)

Green federations 
The member parties of the Global Greens (see for details) are organised into four continental federations:
 Federation of Green Parties of Africa
 Federation of the Green Parties of the Americas / Federación de los Partidos Verdes de las Américas
 Asia-Pacific Green Network
 European Federation of Green Parties

The European Federation of Green Parties formed itself as the European Green Party on 22 February 2004, in the run-up to European Parliament elections in June, 2004, a further step in trans-national integration.

Europe 
 European Green Party
 European Federation of Green Parties/European Free Alliance (faction in the European Parliament)
 European United Left–Nordic Green Leftsocialist faction in the European Parliament

Green parties in Europe 
 Austrian Green Party (Austria)
 Green Party of Armenia (Armenia)
 Groen! (Belgium)
 Ecolo (Belgium)
 Green Party (Czech Republic)
 Estonian Greens
 Vihreä Liitto (Finland)
 Les Verts (France)
 Alliance 90/The Greens (Germany)
 Green Party faction (Bundestag) (Germany)
 Left-Green Movement (Iceland)
 Green Party (Ireland)
 Federation of the Greens (Italy)
 Latvian Green Party (Latvia)
 Free List (Liechtenstein)
 Environment Party The Greens (Norway)
 The Greens (Poland)
 The Greens (Portugal)
 Partido da Terra (Galiza)
 Partido da Terra (Portugal)
 Miljöpartiet de Gröna (Sweden)
 Green Party of Switzerland
 Green Liberal Party of Switzerland
 GroenLinks (The Netherlands)
 The Greens (Netherlands) (The Netherlands)
 Party of Greens of Ukraine (Ukraine)
 United Kingdom
 Green Party in Northern Ireland (Northern Ireland)
 Green Party of England and Wales (England and Wales)
 Scottish Greens (Scotland)
 Initiative for Catalonia Greens (Spain, only in Catalonia)

Africa and Asia 
 Ha-Yerukim (Israel)
 Green Party of Pakistan
 ECOPEACE Party (South Africa)
 Libyan Arab Jamahiriya
 Mazingira Green Party of Kenya
 Rainbow and Greens (Japan)
 Green Party of Malaysia
 Green Party Taiwan

Americas 
 Federation of Green Parties of the Americas

Green parties in the Americas 
 Green Ecological Party of Mexico (Mexico)
 Green Party of Canada (Canada)
 Green Party of British Columbia (Canada)
 Green Party of Ontario (Canada)
 List of Green party leaders in Canada
 List of Green politicians who have held office in Canada
 Green Party (United States) (USA)
 Green Committees of Correspondence
 Greens/Green Party USA
 Boston Proposal
 Green Party Central Option (Colombia)

Oceania 
 Australian Greens Party (Australia)
 United Tasmania Party (Australia)
 Green Party of Aotearoa New Zealand (New Zealand)
 Values Party (New Zealand, historical)
 Wild Greens (New Zealand Green Party youth movement)

Regional variants

African 

 South Africa

American 

 United States

Asian 

 Bangladesh
 China
 India
 Israel
 South Korea
 Taiwan
 Pan-Green Coalitionpolitics of Taiwan

European 

 Switzerland

Oceanian 

 Australia
 New Zealand

Alliances 
 Red-green alliance
 Teal Deal

Notable persons 
 Adolfo Aguilar Zínser (Mexico; Green Senate 1997–2000)
 Lord Beaumont of Whitley (United Kingdom; former member of the Houses of Parliament)
 Natalie Bennett (United Kingdom; current leader of the Green Party of England and Wales)
 Ingrid Betancourt (Colombia; presidency candidate 2002, kidnapped 2002–2008)
Sergio Fajarado (Colombia, ex mayor of Medellin and presidential candidate of 2018) 
Claudia Lopez Hernandez (Colombia, first woman and LGBTQ+ mayor of bogota) 
 Joseph Beuys (Germany; artist and founder member of the German Green Party)
 Jello Biafra (USA; singer-songwriter and runner-up in the US Green Party's presidential nomination 2000)
 Bob Brown (Australia; former leader of the Australian Greens and Senator 1996–2012)
 Martin Bursík (The Czech Republic; former leader of the Czech Green Party and Minister of the Environment)
 Peter Camejo (USA; three-time Green Californian gubernatorial candidate and independent vice-presidential candidate 2004)
 David Cobb (USA; US Green Party's presidential candidate 2004)
 Daniel Cohn-Bendit (France / Germany; former student leader in 1968 and member of the European Parliament 1994–2014)
 Robert Cramer (Switzerland; Green representative in the Swiss Council of States)
 Felix Dodds (United Kingdom; environmental author, futurist, and activist)
 Vera Dua (Belgium; former Flemish Green Party leader and Minister of Agriculture and Environment 1999–2003)
 René Dumont (France; first Green presidential candidate 1974, forefather of the French Green Party Les Verts and founding member of ATTAC)
 Indulis Emsis (Latvia; Prime Minister of Latvia for ten months in 2004, first Green politician to lead a country)
 Joschka Fischer (Germany; leading figure in the German Greens and Vice Chancellor of Germany and Foreign Minister 1998–2005)
 Monica Frassoni (Italy; co-chair of the European Greens group in the European Parliament 2002–2009)
 Liaquat Ali Khan (Pakistan; first Prime Minister of the modern Pakistan)
 Jim Harris (Canada; former leader of the Canadian Green Party 2003–2006)
 Femke Halsema (Netherlands; leader of the Dutch GreenLeft parliamentary party 2002–2010)
 Petra Kelly (Germany; founding member of the German Greens)
 Winfried Kretschmann (Germany; Ministerpräsident Baden-Württemberg)
 Fritz Kuhn (Germany; former chair of German Green's parliamentary group 2005-2009 and first Green mayor of Stuttgart since 2012)
 Renate Künast (Germany; German Minister of Consumer Protection, Food and Agriculture 2001-2005 and chair of the German Green's parliamentary group 2005–2013)
 Winona LaDuke (USA; Native American activist and environmentalist; US Green Party's vice-presidential candidate 1996 and 2000)
 Brice Lalonde (France; French Minister of the Environment 1991-1992 and founder of the green party Génération Ecologie)
 Alain Lipietz (France; Green engineer and economist; member of the European Parliament 1999–2009)
 Caroline Lucas (United Kingdom; co-leader of the Green Party of England and Wales 2016–Present and first Green member of the Houses of Commons since 2010)
 Ulrike Lunacek (Austria; Vice President of the European Parliament since 2014)
 Wangari Maathai (Kenya; environmental and political activist; Nobel Peace Prize winner 2004)
 Noël Mamère (France; Green Party's presidential candidate 2002 and former member of the European Parliament)
 Elizabeth May (Canada; current leader of the Green Party of Canada and first Green member of the Canadian Parliament)
 Ralph Nader (USA; US Green Party's Presidential Candidate 1996 and 2000 as well as independent Presidential Candidate in 2004 and 2008)
 Jonathon Porritt (United Kingdom; environmentalist and advocate of the Green Party of England and Wales)
 Åsa Romson (Sweden; Swedish Minister for the Environment and Deputy Prime Minister since 2014)
 Claudia Roth (Germany; German Green Party leader from 2004 to 2013 and Vice President of the Bundestag since 2013)
 Paul Rosenmöller (Netherlands; leader of the Dutch GreenLeft Party 1994–2002)
 Otto Schily (Germany; German Interior Minister 1998–2005; later switched to SPD)
 E. F. Schumacher (Germany / United Kingdom; Green economic thinker)
 Peter Singer (Australia; moral philosopher and Green candidate for the Australian Senate in 1996)
 Charlene Spretnak (USA; ecofeminist and cofounder of the US Green Party)
 Bart Staes (Belgium; Green member of the European Parliament since 1999)
 Jill Stein (USA; US Green Party's Presidential Candidate for 2012, 2016 and suspected 2020 run)
 Jaromír Štětina (Czech Republic; Green Senator 2004-2014 and member of the European parliament since 2014)
 Jürgen Trittin (Germany; German Minister for the Environment, Nature Conservation and Nuclear Safety 1998-2005 and chair of the Green parliamentary group 2009–2013)
 Alexander Van der Bellen (Austria; leader of the Austrian Green Party 1997–2008; President of Austria since 2017, making him the second green head of state worldwide, the first directly elected by popular vote)
 Raimonds Vējonis (Latvia; President of Latvia since 2015, making him the first green head of state worldwide)
 Jason West (USA; former mayor of New Paltz, New York and same-sex marriage activist)
 Blair Wilson (Canada; former liberal member of the Canadian Parliament, later became member of the Green Party)

Publications 
 List of environmental books
 List of Australian environmental books
 List of books about energy issues
 List of books about nuclear issues
 List of environmental journals
 List of scholarly journals in environmental economics
 List of environmental law reviews and journals
 List of environmental lawsuits
 List of ornithology journals
 List of wildlife magazines
 List of environmental periodicals
 List of environmental agreements
  List of environmental reports
 List of environmental websites

See also 

 Activism
 Climate movement
 Eco-capitalism
 Ecocentrism
 Ecological humanities
 Environmental community organizations
 Environmental groups and resources serving K–12 schools
 Environmental organizations
 Environmental protection
 Environmental tariff
 Environmentalism
 Free-market environmentalism
 Green International
 Green Zionism
 List of conservation topics
 List of conservation issues
 List of environmental disasters
 List of environmental organizations
 Lists of environmental topics
 List of green parties
 List of sustainability topics
 Nordic agrarian parties
 Viridian Greens

References

External links 

 "Global Greens Charter" (2001). Canberra, Australia.
 Ecology and Society. Book on politics and sociology of environmentalism.

Outlines of society
Wikipedia outlines
 
Environmentalism
Environment-related lists